Google OR-Tools is a free and open-source software suite developed by Google for solving linear programming (LP), mixed integer programming (MIP), constraint programming (CP), vehicle routing (VRP), and related optimization problems.

OR-Tools is a set of components written in C++ but provides wrappers for Java, .NET and Python.

It is distributed under the Apache License 2.0.

History 
OR-Tools was created by Laurent Perron in 2011.

In 2014,  Google's open source linear programming solver, GLOP, was released as part of OR-Tools.

The CP-SAT solver bundled with OR-Tools won a total of eleven gold medals between 2018 and 2020 in the MiniZinc Challenge, an international constraint programming competition.

Features 
The OR-Tools supports a variety of programming languages, including:
 Object-oriented interfaces for C++
 A Java wrapper package
 A .NET and .NET Framework wrapper package
 A Python wrapper package

OR-Tools supports a wide range of problem types, among them:
 Assignment problem
 Linear programming
 Mixed-integer programming
 Constraint programming
 Vehicle routing problem
 Network flow algorithms

It supports the FlatZinc modeling language.

See also 
 COIN-OR
 CPLEX
 GLPK
 SCIP (optimization software)
 FICO Xpress

References

Bibliography

External links 
 
 Source code
 Video introduction to OR-Tools

Mathematical optimization software
Numerical programming languages
Numerical software
Optimization algorithms and methods
Software using the Apache license